Durgeshgorer Guptodhon is an Indian Bengali adventure thriller film directed by Dhrubo Banerjee  and produced by Shrikant Mohta and Mahendra Soni. This is the sequel to Guptodhoner Sandhane and the second film in the Sona Da franchise. This film was released on 24 May 2019 under the banner of SVF Entertainment.

Plot
Professor Subarna Sen, aka Sonada, a professor of history, along with Abir and Jhinuk decide to visit one of Sonada's student's ancestral mansion at Durgeshgor. The ancestor of this student, Durgagati Deb Roy, was an erstwhile zamindar and a renowned artist of Bengal. There is a myth that runs in the family that they had once received a massive treasure from famous King Krishnachandra Roy after the Battle of Plassey. Presently all traces and trails of it have been lost. Sonada along with Abir and Jhinuk join the festival of Durga Puja in that mansion and stumble upon the lost clues that may lead them in unearthing one of the greatest treasures of Bengal.

Cast 
 Abir Chatterjee as Professor Subarna Sen aka. Sona da
 Arjun Chakrabarty as Abirlal Roy/Abir
 Ishaa Saha as Jhinuk Majumdar
 Anindya Chatterjee as Pinakpani Deb Roy
 Kaushik Sen as Trishulpani Deb Roy
 Aryann Bhowmik as Damburopani Deb Roy aka Dumble
 Lily Chakravarty as Pishima
 June Maliah as Rini Boudi
 Debjani Chattopadhyay as Moni Boudi
 Kharaj Mukherjee as Aparup da
 Arindam Sil as Subir Roy
 Kamaleswar Mukherjee as Akhilesh Majumdar
 Baishakhi Marjit as Rai Roy
 Master Bihan Saha Dalal as Kucho
 Amit Saha in a cameo role
 Lama Halder in a cameo role

Soundtrack

The background score and the soundtracks are composed by Bickram Ghosh and lyrics are penned down by Shubhendu Das Munshi.

Reception
Following the trivia of the previous film Guptodhoner Sandhane, Durgeshgorer Guptodhon was also a box office blockbuster and the highest grossing Bengali film of 2019. The movie received mostly positive reviews from critics. Upam Buzarbaruah of The Times of India gave it a rating of 3.5 out of 5. Antara Mazumdar of Anandabazar Patrika gave it a rating of 6.5 out of 10. Firstpost'''s editor Bhaskar Chattopadhyay rated the movie 3 out of 5, saying "Durgeshgorer Guptodhon, like his previous film, too tells the adventurous story of the trio, who has by now captured the imagination of Bengali audiences, both young and old. Flavored in a dizzying marinade of history and lore, and garnished with ample doses of puzzles, riddles, ciphers, and hidden codes, it is one of the more intelligent Bengali films in recent times. The puzzles seem neither fake nor forced, the clues are in fact quite exciting to decode, and the overall breezy nature of the storytelling ensures that even the strictest of critics have a jolly good time. I know I did".

SequelA sequel titled Karnasubarner Guptodhon'' was released on 30 September 2022, with Abir Chatterjee, Arjun Chakraborty and Ishaa Saha reprising their roles, directed by Dhrubo Banerjee.

References

External links
 

2019 films
Bengali-language Indian films
2010s Bengali-language films
2010s adventure thriller films
Indian adventure thriller films
Films scored by Bickram Ghosh